It's Time is a 1962 album by jazz drummer Max Roach, released on Impulse! Records which also features trumpeter Richard Williams, tenor saxophonist Clifford Jordan, trombonist Julian Priester, pianist Mal Waldron, bassist Art Davis, and a vocal choir conducted by Coleridge-Taylor Perkinson. Singer Abbey Lincoln appears on "Lonesome Lover".

Track listing
All composed by Max Roach

"It's Time" – 6:44
"Another Valley" – 8:46
"Sunday Afternoon" – 6:16
"Living Room" – 7:31
"The Profit" – 7:32
"Lonesome Lover" – 7:02

Recorded on February 15 (tracks 1, 4), February 26 (tracks 2, 5), February 27 (tracks 3, 6), 1962.

Personnel
Max Roach – drums
Richard Williams – trumpet
Julian Priester – trombone
Clifford Jordan – tenor saxophone
Mal Waldron – piano
Art Davis – bass
Coleridge-Taylor Perkinson – conductor
Abbey Lincoln – vocals (#6)

References

Max Roach albums
1962 albums
Impulse! Records albums
Albums produced by Bob Thiele